Pierangelo Garegnani (9 August 1930–14 October 2011) was an Italian economist and professor of the University of Rome III. He was the Director of the Fondazione Centro Piero Sraffa di Studi e Documenti at the Federico Caffè School of Economics, and also the literary executor of the works, documents and papers left by the Italian economist Piero Sraffa to the University of Cambridge's Wren Library.

Professor Garegnani was one of the leading theoretical critics of neoclassical economics. He published several books and articles concerning the classical economic theory, from Ricardo to Sraffa, as an alternative theoretical foundation to analyse the capitalist economy. An account of his contributions was published by the Royal Economic Society. During the 1980s, Garegnani worked as a visiting professor at The New School.

Works
See list of last works at the IDEAS site: Information about Pierangelo Garegnani at IDEAS.

Further reading
Mongiovi, G. and Petri F. (eds.), Value, Distribution and capital. Essays in honor of Pierangelo Garegnani, London, Routledge, .

References

1930 births
2011 deaths
Italian economists
Academic staff of Roma Tre University